Surgeon Commodore Fleur T. Marshall is a general practitioner and senior Royal Navy officer. Since 2021, she has served as Head of the Royal Navy Medical Service and Medical Director General (Naval).

Military career
Educated at Repton School and Bristol University, Marshall joined the Royal Navy in 1992. She became a Regional Clinical Director in 2013, Medical Officer in Charge of the Institute of Naval Medicine in 2016 and Head of Future Healthcare in 2019. She was appointed Head of the Royal Navy Medical Service and Medical Director General (Naval) in April 2021.

References

Royal Navy commodores
Alumni of the University of Bristol
Living people
Year of birth missing (living people)